Zhao Ruozhu (born 7 August 1998) is a Chinese sport shooter. She won gold medal in 10 m air rifle at the 2018 Asian Games. She also won a Silver in 10 m air rifle in mixed events along with Yang Haoran.

References

External links

1988 births
Living people
Chinese female sport shooters
ISSF rifle shooters
Sport shooters from Shanxi
Shooters at the 2018 Asian Games
Medalists at the 2018 Asian Games
Asian Games gold medalists for China
Asian Games silver medalists for China
Asian Games medalists in shooting